Milk Kan is a musical duo from south London, England, formed in 2003. Their EPs, the acoustic "Bling!" (2003) and "Wat U See Ain't Wat U Get" were followed, in December 2005, by a single, "Bling Bling Baby" and their later single, "God with an Ipod". Milk Kan began as Scrappy Hood and Jimmy Blade busked with their mothers’ guitars on London's trains, tubes and late night buses, crafting their mix of Guthrie storytelling, punk energy and old skool hip hop. Following the release of their bedroom-recorded first single in 2004, they swapped public transport busking for the lower east side of New York City, playing local open mic haunts before returning to London and signing with PIAS Records. In late 2007, Milk Kan moved to the east London independent record label, BLANG. Their first album was released in March 2009.

Joined by their drummer Loz Vegas, whom they met at school, Milk Kan's first single "Bling Bling Baby" (PIAS Records) reached No. 13 in the independent charts, and was played by BBC DJs Chris Moyles, Steve Lamacq, Jonathan Ross and Mark Radcliffe, leading Milk Kan into live performances, supporting the Violent Femmes at Shepherd's Bush Empire, the Strokes at Hyde Park’s Wireless Festival, Babyshambles at East London's Rhythm Factory and UK tours supporting ska punks The King Blues.

Following their signing to Blang in November 2007, a collaboration with the Dolly Parton, "Here Ya Come Again & Again", was released as a limited edition vinyl to critical acclaim (BBC Steve Lamacq’s “single of the week”). They recorded their first album and released God with an Ipod in December 2008 which reached No. 10 in the UK independent charts and led to a session for BBC Radio 1 DJ Huw Stephens which was broadcast in January 2009.

Following the release of their first album in March 2009, Huw Stephens made the album Record of The Week on his In New Music We Trust radio show. In July 2009, Milk Kan played the BBC Introducing stage at Scotland’s T in The Park festival after making a huge impact on their first headline tour of Scotland and an appearance at the Sound City Festival, Liverpool. They ended the year with a YouTube video for “Who Broke Susan Boyle?” – the B side to their summer single “Don’t Panic”.

In November 2010 they released 'Junkshop' as a taster single from their album by the same name, released later in 2011.

Milk Kan now also run their own Channel 4-endorsed TV show called Junkshop TV which can be viewed on their YouTube channel.

References

External links
 Official website
 MilkKan on Youtube

English hip hop groups
Musical groups from London